Avos may refer to:
 Avos, a shortening of Pirkei Avos, a tractate of the Jewish Talmud
 Avos (ship), a ship in an expedition by Nikolai Rezanov which became a basis for the 1978 Russian rock opera Juno and Avos
 Juno and Avos (opera)
 Avos, the plural for avo, which is 1/100 of a Macao pataca, a monetary unit of Macao
 AVOS Systems, an Internet company
 Russian avos', a Russian word describing a particular attitude to the course of events